Tassis Christoyannis (born Athens, 1967) is a Greek operatic baritone. He studied conducting and composing at the Athens Conservatory and singing with Aldo Protti, winning the Aldo Protti Gold Medal in 1994. In addition to operatic roles he is known for his recordings of French melodies with American pianist Jeff Cohen, primarily for the Palazzetto Bru Zane and Aparté.

Selected discography
Félicien David: Melodies. Aparté, 2014.
Edouard Lalo: Complete Songs Tassis Christoyannis, Jeff Cohen Aparté – AP110 2CD 
Benjamin Godard: Mélodies Tassis Christoyannis, Jeff Cohen Aparté – AP123
Saint-Saëns: Mélodies Tassis Christoyannis, Jeff Cohen Aparté – AP132
Fernand de La Tombelle: Mélodies  Tassis Christoyannis, Jeff Cohen Aparté – AP148

References

20th-century Greek male opera singers
1967 births
Living people
21st-century Greek male opera singers
Greek baritones
Operatic baritones
Singers from Athens